Rajim railway station is a main railway station in Raipur district, Chhattisgarh. Its code is RIM. It serves Rajim village. The station consists of two platforms. The station lies on the Abhanpur–Rajim branch line of Bilaspur–Nagpur section.

Major trains 

 Abhanpur–Rajim NG Passenger
 Rajim–Kendri NG Passenger

References

Railway stations in Raipur district
Raipur railway division